This page details statistics, records, and other achievements pertaining to championship golfer Jack Nicklaus.

Major championships

Wins (18)

1Defeated Palmer in 18-hole playoff; Nicklaus (71), Palmer (74).
2Defeated Jacobs (2nd) & Brewer (3rd) in 18-hole playoff; Nicklaus (70), Jacobs (72), Brewer (78). 1st, 2nd and 3rd prizes awarded in this playoff.
3Defeated Sanders in 18-hole playoff; Nicklaus (72), Sanders (73).

Records and trivia
In a span of 25 years, from 1962 (age 22) to 1986 (age 46), Nicklaus won 18 professional major championships. This is the most any player has won in his career.
Nicklaus held sole possession of the lead after 54 holes of a major championship on eight occasions and won each in regulation. 
Nicklaus won 10 of 12 major championships when having the lead outright or tied for the lead after 54 holes and won eight times when trailing after 54 holes.
In the above-referenced 20 major championships where Nicklaus either won (18) or finished in second place (2), he was a combined 30 strokes under par in final round scoring.
In 18 professional major championship victories, Nicklaus shot 56 rounds at even par or below. 
Nicklaus won two major championships in a season on five occasions (1963, 1966, 1972, 1975, and 1980).
Nicklaus won at least one major championship in four consecutive years (1970–1973).
Nicklaus is one of five players (along with Gene Sarazen, Ben Hogan, Gary Player, and Tiger Woods) to have won all four professional major championships in his career, known as the Career Grand Slam, and the second-youngest to do so in his fifth year as a professional at age 26 (Tiger Woods, fourth year at age 24). 
At age 33 in 1973, Nicklaus broke Bobby Jones' record of 13 major championships (old configuration) and Walter Hagen's record of 11 professional major championships by winning his third PGA Championship; 14th and 12th win, respectively.
One of two players to achieve a "triple career slam" i.e. winning all four major championships three times in a career, the other being Tiger Woods.
Nicklaus made 39 consecutive cuts in major championships starting at the 1969 Masters and ending by being cut at the 1978 PGA Championship. In this span he won eight times, was runner-up seven times, and had 33 top-10 finishes. This record of consecutive cuts made in major championships was equaled by Tiger Woods at the 2006 Masters.
Nicklaus holds the record for most runner-up finishes in majors with 19.
Nicklaus holds the record for most top-five finishes in major championships with 56.
One of two players to finish in the top five in all four professional major championships in two different years (1971 and 1973), the other being Tiger Woods (2000 and 2005). Both players finished in the top four in all four majors once (1973 and 2005, respectively). Bobby Jones won the "Grand Slam" under the old configuration in 1930 and Ben Hogan won all three of the majors he was able to play in 1953.
Nicklaus holds the record for most top-10 finishes in major championships with 73. This is 25 and 27 more than the next players Sam Snead (48) and Tom Watson (46), respectively.
Nicklaus finished in the top-10 in his final three professional major championships as an amateur (second in the 1960 U.S. Open, seventh in the 1961 Masters, and fourth in the 1961 U.S. Open). 
Nicklaus played 154 consecutive majors for which he was eligible, from the 1957 U.S. Open through the 1998 U.S. Open.

Masters Tournament
Nicklaus holds the record for most wins with six which is two more than Arnold Palmer and one more than Tiger Woods.
Nicklaus shot 17-under par 271 in 1965 for a 72-hole record lasting 32 years until Tiger Woods shot 18-under par 270 in 1997.
Nicklaus shot individual rounds of 67 or better a total of 14 times which equates to a combined 80-under par.
Nicklaus was the first champion to successfully defend the title having done so in 1966.
Nicklaus won this event three times in his first five attempts as a professional.
Nicklaus is the youngest two-time champion of this event.
Nicklaus is the youngest three-time champion of this event.
Nicklaus is the oldest winner of the Masters at 46 years and 82 days when he won in 1986.
Nicklaus was a wire-to-wire winner in 1972.
Nicklaus was runner-up a record four times.
Nicklaus holds the record for most top-five finishes with 15.
Nicklaus holds the record for most top-10 finishes with 22.
In the decade of the 1970s, Nicklaus finished in the top 10 at Augusta every year with eight top-four finishes.
Nicklaus holds the record for the lowest 72-hole score for a player over 50 having shot a 5-under par 283 in 1998 at age 58.
Nicklaus was the oldest first-round leader (co-led with four others) shooting 67 in 1993 at age 53.
Nicklaus holds the record for lowest scoring average of players with over 100 rounds at 71.98 for 163 rounds.
Nicklaus competed in this event 45 times.
Nicklaus holds the record for most cuts made with 37.
Nicklaus holds the record for most birdies with 506. 
Nicklaus holds the record for most eagles with 24.
For 34 consecutive years (1960 through 1993), Nicklaus missed just one 36-hole cut (1967).

U.S. Open
Nicklaus holds the record with Willie Anderson, Bobby Jones and Ben Hogan for most wins at the U.S Open with four.
Nicklaus is the only player to win the title in three different decades with his first in 1962 and fourth in 1980.
Nicklaus is the youngest champion of this event in the modern era having won in 1962 at age 22. This has since been beaten by Rory McIlroy in 2011.
Nicklaus held until 2011 the record for lowest score for 72 holes (272) with Lee Janzen (67-67-69-69) in 1993, Tiger Woods (65-69-71-67) in 2000, and Jim Furyk (67-66-67-72) in 2003. Nicklaus shot 63-71-70-68 in 1980.
Nicklaus shares the record for lowest score for 18 holes (63). It was set by Johnny Miller (fourth round in 1973) and equalled by Nicklaus and Tom Weiskopf (both first round in 1980) and Vijay Singh (second round in 2003).
Nicklaus was a wire-to-wire winner in 1972 and 1980.
Nicklaus holds the record for lowest 72-hole score shot by an amateur at two-under par 282 in 1960. While he finished second to Arnold Palmer by two shots, Nicklaus was the only player in the field not to have one round above the par of 71.
Nicklaus tied for fourth in 1961 having played the final 54 holes in one-under par and capturing Low Amateur honors for the second consecutive year.
Nicklaus had four runner-up finishes.
Nicklaus had a record 11 top-five finishes.
Nicklaus had a record 18 top-10 finishes.
Nicklaus holds the record for most rounds in the 60s at 29.
Nicklaus holds the record for most sub-par rounds at 37.
Nicklaus holds the record for most sub-par championships (72 holes) completed at seven.
Nicklaus holds the record for the most consecutive tournaments started with 44 (1957–2000).
Nicklaus holds the record for most cuts made at 35.
Nicklaus made 21 consecutive cuts from 1964 through 1984.
Nicklaus made a record five consecutive birdies in the final round of the 1982 U.S. Open.

The Open Championship
Nicklaus won this event three times.
Nicklaus was runner-up a record seven times.
Nicklaus had a record 11 straight top-five finishes from 1970 to 1980. 
Nicklaus had a record 16 top-five finishes.
Nicklaus had a record 15 straight top-10 finishes from 1966 to 1980.
Nicklaus had a record 18 top-10 finishes.
Nicklaus holds the record for most rounds in the 60s at 33.
Nicklaus never finished worse than sixth from 1966 to 1980.
Nicklaus was the first player to break 270 for four rounds having done so in 1977. 
Nicklaus made the cut in 32 out of 38 appearances including 23 consecutively from 1962 through 1984.

PGA Championship
Nicklaus holds the record with Walter Hagen for most wins at the PGA Championship with 5.
Nicklaus was a wire-to-wire winner in 1971.
Nicklaus was runner-up four times.
Nicklaus holds the record for most top-three finishes with 12.
Nicklaus holds the record for most top-five finishes with 14.
Nicklaus holds the record for most top-10 finishes with 15.
Nicklaus holds the record for most top-25 finishes with 23.
Nicklaus holds the record for most rounds in the 60s at 41.
Nicklaus holds the record for lowest scoring average of players with over 75 rounds at 71.37 for 128 rounds.
Nicklaus holds the record for most cuts made at 27 (with Raymond Floyd).
Nicklaus competed in this event 37 times which is second only to Sam Snead's record of 38.
Nicklaus held the record for the greatest winning margin in the stroke play era from 1958 to 2011. He won by 7 strokes in 1980; Rory McIlroy won by 8 strokes in 2012.

Results timeline

LA = Low amateur
CUT = missed the half-way cut
WD  = withdrew
"T" indicates a tie for a place.

Summary of performances
Starts – 164
Wins – 18
Runners-up – 19
Top 3 finishes – 46
Top 5 finishes – 56
Top 10 finishes – 73
Top 25 finishes – 95
Made Cuts – 131
Missed Cuts – 32
Withdrew  – 1
Longest streak of top-five finishes in majors – 7 (1971 Masters to 1972 Open Championship)
Longest streak of top-10s in majors – 13 (1973 Masters to 1976 Masters)
Longest streak of top-15 finishes in majors – 33 (1970 Open Championship to 1978 Open Championship)
Longest streak of top-25 finishes in majors – 33 (1970 Open Championship to 1978 Open Championship)
Longest streak without missing a cut – 39 (1969 Masters to 1978 Open Championship)

Source:

The Players Championship

Wins (3)

Results timeline

CUT = missed the halfway cut
"T" indicates a tie for a place.

Senior major championships

Wins (8)

1Defeated Rodríguez in 18-hole playoff; Nicklaus, (65), Rodríguez (69).
2Defeated Aoki with a birdie on the third extra playoff hole.

Results timeline

CUT = missed the half-way cut
WD  = withdrew
"T" indicates a tie for a place.
Note: The Senior British Open was not a Champions Tour major until 2003.

Summary of performances
Starts – 50
Cuts made – 46 (cut once, withdrew 3 times)
Wins – 8
Second place finishes – 5
Top-three finishes – 15
Top-five finishes – 18
Top-10 finishes – 30
Longest streak of top-10s – 10

PGA Tour career summary

Green background for 1st. Yellow background for top-10.
All-time money list rank is complete as of February 23, 2011.
Nicklaus' position on the all-time money list is misleading, given he is regarded as one of the greatest golfers of all time. Tournament purses have expanded considerably since his prime. For example, Nicklaus received $144,000 for winning the Masters in 1986 while Zach Johnson received $1,305,000 for winning the Masters in 2007. He led the list through the 1988 season.
Despite leading the Tour in scoring average eight times, Nicklaus never won the Vardon Trophy because he often did not play the minimum required number of rounds to qualify for the trophy. Prior to 1988, the minimum number of rounds was 80 vs. 60 today.

Source:

Amateur wins (18)
1953 Ohio State Junior Championship (13–15 yrs)
1954 Tri-State High School Championship (Ohio, Kentucky, Indiana)
1954 Ohio State Junior Championship (13–15 yrs)
1955 Ohio State Junior Championship (13–15 yrs)
1956 Columbus Amateur Match-play Championship
1957 International Jaycee Junior Golf Tournament
1958 Trans-Mississippi Amateur, Queen City Open Championship
1959 Trans-Mississippi Amateur, U.S. Amateur, North and South Amateur, Royal St. George's Challenge Cup
1960 Eisenhower Trophy (individual), Colonial Invitational
1961 U.S. Amateur, NCAA Championship (individual), Big Ten Conference Championship (individual), Western Amateur

Amateur major wins (2)

Results timeline

R256, R128, R64, R32, R16, QF, SF = Round in which player lost in match play

Sources:

Professional wins (117)

PGA Tour wins (73)

PGA Tour playoff record (14–10)

Source:

European Tour wins (9)

PGA Tour of Australasia wins (3)

Other wins (24)

*Note: Tournament shortened to 54/63 holes due to weather.

Other playoff record (2–1)

Senior PGA Tour wins (10)

*Note: The 1990 Tradition at Desert Mountain was shortened to 54 holes due to rain.

Senior PGA Tour playoff record (2–1)

Other senior wins (7)

Miscellaneous stats

Nicklaus won the prestigious The Players Championship three times (though never at the TPC at Sawgrass, the current Players site and a course whose setup he harshly criticized in the early 1980s, likening some of its approach shots to "stopping a 5-iron on the hood of a car"). He was the first multiple winner of this event and remains the only three-time champion winning three of the first five contested (1974, 1976, and 1978).  Nicklaus' 19-under par score of 269 in 1976 was the record for this championship until 1994, when Greg Norman shot 24-under par, and remains the second lowest 72-hole score for the championship.
Nicklaus won various events around the globe, including six Australian Opens (1964, 1968, 1971, 1975, 1976 and 1978) and the Piccadilly World Match Play Championship in 1970.
From 1963 to 1977, Nicklaus won the Tournament of Champions a record five times with one runner-up playoff finish. Of these five victories, he recorded an eight-shot winning margin in 1971, which is also a record.
Nicklaus is third to Sam Snead (82) and Tiger Woods (82) on the all-time list of players with most PGA Tour wins, having accumulated 73 titles.  Of these 73 wins, 66 were against full-field populations, while only seven were against limited fields.
Nicklaus total wins of 73, total runners-up finishes of 58, and total third-place finishes of 36 is an unmatched total of 167 top-three finishes on the PGA Tour. In addition, Nicklaus registered 218 top-five and 310 top-10 finishes.
 At age 16, Nicklaus won the Ohio Open against a field of mainly professional golfers.  While not an official PGA win, it was previously sanctioned as such and former champions include three-time winner Byron Nelson, among others. 
In 17 consecutive seasons from 1962 to 1978, Nicklaus won at least two PGA Tour titles per season, and always finished in the top four on the money list. During these years British Open winnings were not included in the official money list rankings. If so, Nicklaus would have finished no worse than third in any year since he won that major in 1970 and 1978 and his additional top finishes would likely have affected other years' placings.
Nicklaus won a total of eight USGA national championships, including two U.S. Amateurs (1959 and 1961), four U.S. Opens (1962, 1967, 1972, and 1980), and two U.S. Senior Opens (1991 and 1993).
Nicklaus is the only player to win the U.S. Amateur and the U.S. Open at the same course Pebble Beach Golf Links in 1961 and 1972, respectively.
From 1970 to 1976, Nicklaus made 105 consecutive cuts which at the time was second only to Byron Nelson's record of 113.
Nicklaus won the inaugural semi-full field World Series of Golf championship in 1976 by four shots over Hale Irwin. This marked his third different official PGA event (1968 American Golf Classic and the 1975 PGA Championship) victory at Firestone Country Club and excludes four earlier wins in the old World Series of Golf format from 1962 through 1975.
Nicklaus shot a course record 59 for 18 holes during an exhibition event. 1973 American Cancer Society's Palm Beach Golf Classic played at The Breakers. The course was a par 70. The other players Sam Snead shot 69, Kathy Whitworth shot 69 and Kathy Ahern shot 74.
Nicklaus was the first PGA Tour player to reach the $2,000,000 mark in career earnings (December 1, 1973), $3,000,000 (May 2, 1977), $4,000,000 (February 6, 1983), and $5,000,000 (August 20, 1988).
Nicklaus was the PGA Tour's career money leader from 1973 to 1988.
Nicklaus was a member of a record-tying six World Cup teams all of which being victorious and a record-tying combination of four with Arnold Palmer. Nicklaus also won a record-setting three individual International Trophy titles in the competition, was runner-up once, and finished third twice.
Nicklaus played his way onto six Ryder Cup teams beginning in 1969. However, by today's qualification standards, he would have been eligible for the 1963, 1965, and 1967 teams. In addition, captain's picks were not available until 1989. If prior, Nicklaus would likely have been on the 1979 team, increasing his total to 10.
Nicklaus played in his first PGA tournament at age 18 in the 1958 Rubber City Open Invitational at Akron's Firestone Country Club, was one stroke back of the lead at halfway point with rounds of 67 and 66 and finished 76-68 for 12th spot. 
At the 1990 Senior Players Championship, Nicklaus shot a 27-under-par 261 at Dearborn Country Club, the lowest 72-hole total in Champions Tour history, Pádraig Harrington tied this record in winning the 2022 Charles Schwab Cup Championship.
In 1996, Nicklaus was the first person to win the same Senior PGA Tour (now the Champions Tour) event four times, when he captured The Tradition tournament.
Nicklaus is the only person in the history of the PGA to win all of the major championships on both the PGA Tour and Champions Tour. (Although he never won the Senior British Open, it was not recognized as a major in the United States until 2003, after he had stopped playing the Champions Tour.)
With eight Champions Tour major championship victories, Nicklaus has won more than any other golfer.
Nicklaus is 14–10 in PGA Tour playoffs (including the 1970 Open Championship), which incorporates a 3–1 record in major championships.  Nicklaus also holds a 2–1 record in Champions Tour playoffs.
Nicklaus has made 20 career holes-in-one in competition.

U.S. national team appearances

As player
Amateur
Walker Cup: 1959 (winners), 1961 (winners)
Eisenhower Trophy: 1960 (team winners and individual leader)
Americas Cup: 1960 (winners), 1961 (winners)

Professional
Ryder Cup: 1969 (tie), 1971 (winners), 1973 (winners), 1975 (winners), 1977 (winners), 1981 (winners)
Cumulative 17–8–3 record across six matches: 8–1–0 record in foursomes matches, 5–3–1 record in four-ball matches, 4–4–2 record in singles matches, for a combined point total of 18.5 and a 66% win percentage. 
World Cup: 1963 (winners, individual winner), 1964 (winners, individual winner), 1965, 1966 (winners), 1967 (winners), 1971 (winners, individual winner), 1973 (winners)
Wendy's 3-Tour Challenge (representing Senior PGA Tour): 1992, 1993 (winners), 1994, 1995 (winners), 1997, 1999 (winners), 2001

As captain
Professional
Ryder Cup: 1983 (winners), 1987
Presidents Cup: 1998, 2003 (tie), 2005 (winners), 2007 (winners)

Awards
Named greatest golfer/athlete by Sports Illustrated; Golf Magazine; Associated Press; Golfweek; Golf World; PGA Tour and GolfWeb; ESPN; British Broadcasting Company; and Today's Golfer.
Named golfer of the Century/Millennium by Asian Golf Monthly, Associated Press, British Broadcasting Company, Golf Digest, Golf Magazine, Golf Monthly, Golfweek, Golf Web, Golf World, International Association of Golf Tour Operators, PGA Tour, Today's Golfer.
Named Florida Athlete of the Century.
Received a Doctor of Athletic Arts Honorary Degree from Ohio State University, 1972. 
Inducted into the World Golf Hall of Fame in the inaugural class of 1974.
Received a Doctor of Laws Honorary Degree from the University of St. Andrews in Scotland.
Inducted into the Memorial Honorees at the Memorial Tournament, 2000.
Received the Vince Lombardi Award of Excellence in 2001 being the first golfer and only the third athlete in the award's history.
Presidential Medal of Freedom recipient in 2005
Inducted into the PGA Golf Professional Hall of Fame in the class of 2006.
Presented with the Woodrow Wilson Award for Corporate Citizenship by the Woodrow Wilson Center of the Smithsonian Institution in Palm Beach, Florida; January 2008.
Presented with the Charlie Bartlett Award from the Golf Writers Association of America at its annual awards dinner in Augusta, Georgia in April 2009 recognizing four decades of charitable work with children.
Presented with the National Pathfinder Award at the annual Pathfinder Awards Banquet in June 2009 at Conseco Fieldhouse in Indiana for decades of dedication to youth in need, most recently through the Nicklaus Children's Health Care Foundation.
Congressional Gold Medal recipient in 2015; he joins golfers Arnold Palmer and Byron Nelson.
Awarded Star #41 on The Flag for Hope on June 30, 2016; in recognition of his exceptional PGA career and his philanthropic efforts to assist children in need via the Nicklaus Children's Health Care Foundation.

This list is probably incomplete.

1962
PGA Tour Rookie of the Year

1964
PGA Tour Money Winner
PGA Tour Scoring Average Leader

1965
PGA Tour Money Winner
PGA Tour Scoring Average Leader

1967
PGA Player of the Year
PGA Tour Money Winner

1971
PGA Tour Money Winner
PGA Tour Scoring Average Leader

1972
Doctor of Athletic Arts Honorary Degree, Ohio State University
PGA Player of the Year
PGA Tour Money Winner
PGA Tour Scoring Average Leader

1973
PGA Player of the Year
PGA Tour Money Winner
PGA Tour Scoring Average Leader

1974
World Golf Hall of Fame
PGA Tour Scoring Average Leader

1975
Bob Jones Award
PGA Player of the Year
PGA Tour Money Winner
PGA Tour Scoring Average Leader

1976
PGA Player of the Year
PGA Tour Money Winner
PGA Tour Scoring Average Leader

1978
Sports Illustrated Sportsman of the Year

1979
Athlete of the Decade (named by national sports writers)
Golfer of the Seventies

1980
BBC Sports Personality of the Year Overseas Personality
Golf World Player of the Year

1984
Doctor of Laws Honorary Degree, University of St. Andrews

1988
Golfer of the Century (named by golfing officials and journalists from around the world)

1993
Golf Course Architect of the Year (named by Golf World)

1995
Canadian Golf Hall of Fame

1996
Golfer of The Century (named by Golf Monthly magazine)

1999
Best Individual Male Athlete of the 20th Century (named by Sports Illustrated)

2000
Payne Stewart Award
PGA of America Distinguished Service Award
Memorial Honoree, Memorial Tournament

2001
ESPY Lifetime Achievement Award
Vince Lombardi Award of Excellence

2003
Greater Columbus Hospitality Award
Muhammad Ali Sports Legend Awards
The Three Amigos George Bush Inspiration Award

2005
GCSAA Old Tom Morris Award
Presidential Medal of Freedom

2006
PGA Golf Professional Hall of Fame

2007
Boy Scouts of America Distinguished Citizens Award
Francis Ouimet Lifelong Contributions to Golf

2008
PGA Tour Lifetime Achievement Award
Woodrow Wilson Award for Corporate Citizenship

2009
Charlie Bartlett Award
Golf Course Architect of the Year in Asia Pacific
National Pathfinder Award

2015
Congressional Gold Medal

Source:

References

External links

Nicklaus
Jack Nicklaus